The 2021–22 season is Burton Albion's 72nd year in their history and fourth consecutive season in League One. Along with the league, the club will also compete in the FA Cup, the EFL Cup and the EFL Trophy. The season covers the period from 1 July 2021 to 30 June 2022.

First-team squad

Statistics

|-
!colspan=15|Players who are out on loan:

|-
!colspan=15|Players who have left the club:

|}

Goals record

Disciplinary record

Pre-season friendlies
Burton Albion confirmed they would play friendlies against Nuneaton Borough, Bognor Regis Town, Scunthorpe United, Grantham Town, Leicester City, Alfreton Town, Newcastle United and Belper Town as part of their pre-season preparations.

Competitions

League One

League table

Results summary

Results by matchday

Matches
Burton Albion's fixtures were revealed on 24 June 2021.

FA Cup

Burton Albion were drawn away to Fleetwood Town in the first round and at home to Port Vale in the second round.

EFL Cup

Burton Albion were drawn at home to Oxford United in the first round.

EFL Trophy

Burton were drawn into Group C in the Southern section, alongside Milton Keynes Dons and Wycombe Wanderers. On July 7, the group stage matches were confirmed.

Birmingham Senior Cup

Albion were drawn away to Stratford Town in the first round.

Transfers

Transfers in

Loans in

Loans out

Transfers out

References

Burton Albion
Burton Albion F.C. seasons